The 1977 World Championship for Makes season featured the sixth FIA World Championship for Makes. This was a motor racing series for Group 5 Special Production Cars, Group 3 & 4 Grand Touring Cars and Group 1 & 2 Touring Cars which ran from 5 February to 23 October 1977 and comprised nine races.

Schedule

Race results

Points system
Points towards the World Championship for Makes were awarded for the first ten eligible finishers in each race in the order of 20-15-12-10-8-6-4-3-2-1. A make was only awarded points for its highest finishing eligible car and no points were awarded for placings gained by any other car of that make.

Only the best seven results counted towards the championship, with any other points earned not included in the total. Discarded points are shown within brackets.

Half points were awarded for Round 7 due to the race being stopped prior to half distance.

The same points system was applied to each of the three Divisional awards, with cars classified as follows:
 Division 1: Up to 2000cc 
 Division 2: 2001 - 3000cc  
 Division 3: 3001 - 6000cc

Championships results

The cars
The following models contributed to the nett point scores of their respective makes.

Outright

 Porsche 935
 BMW 320i
 De Tomaso Pantera
 Ferrari 365 GTB/4 Daytona
 Fiat X1/9
 Lancia Stratos
 Ford Escort

Division 1

 BMW 320i
 Ford Escort
 Fiat X1/9
 Porsche
 Lotus Elan
 Colt Lancer
 Volkswagen Golf

Division 2

 Porsche 911 Carrera 
 BMW 320i
 Lancia Stratos
 Ford Capri
 Datsun 240Z

Division 3

 Porsche 935
 De Tomaso Pantera
 Ferrari 365 GTB/4 Daytona
 MGB GT V8

World Championship for Sports Cars

For 1977, the FIA again organised two separate World Championships for “sports cars”, with Group 6 cars contesting the World Championship for Sports Cars and production-based cars competing in the World Championship for Makes. Events in which both types of car ran, such as the 12 Hours of Sebring or 24 Hours of Le Mans, were not counted towards either championship.

Following the 1977 season, the World Championship of Makes would become the sole international championship, while the World Championship for Sports Cars would be downgraded by the FIA to become the European Sportscar Championship. That series would only last the 1978 season before being dissolved.

References

External links
 1977 World Championship for Makes results

World Sportscar Championship seasons
World Sportscar Championship